Isle du Bois Creek is a river in Texas.

See also
List of rivers of Texas

References

Rivers of Cooke County, Texas
Rivers of Denton County, Texas
Rivers of Grayson County, Texas
Rivers of Texas